Uncut is a monthly magazine based in London. It is available across the English-speaking world, and focuses on music, but also includes film and books sections. A DVD magazine under the Uncut brand was published quarterly from 2005 to 2006. The magazine was acquired in 2019 by Singaporean music company BandLab Technologies, and has been published by NME Networks since December 2021.

Uncut (main magazine)
Uncut was launched in May 1997 by IPC as "a monthly magazine aimed at 25- to 45-year-old men that focuses on music and movies", edited by Allan Jones (former editor of Melody Maker). Jones has stated that "[t]he idea for Uncut came from my own disenchantment about what I was doing with Melody Maker. There was a publishing initiative to make the audience younger; I was getting older and they wanted to take the readers further away from me", specifically referring to the then dominant Britpop genre.

According to IPC Media, 86% of the magazine's readers are male and their average age is 37 years.

Uncut'''s contents include lengthy features on old albums, interviews with film directors, music and film news, and reviews of all major new album, film and DVD releases. Its music features tend to focus on genres such as Americana, rock and alternative country. Each month the magazine includes a free CD, which may include both new and older music. Special Issues have covered U2, Radiohead, Bob Dylan, Bruce Springsteen, the Byrds, David Bowie, Demon Records, Eric Clapton, John Lennon, Pink Floyd, Queen, Martin Scorsese, Motown Records, Morrissey, George Harrison, Jimmy Page, Led Zeppelin, the Beach Boys, Paul McCartney, Neil Young, the Beatles, Elvis Costello, the Kinks, Fleetwood Mac and more.Uncut underwent a radical redesign in May 2006, as a result of which the magazine no longer catered for books and reduced its film content.

Allan Jones writes a regular monthly column, recounting stories from his long career in music journalism.Uncuts monthly circulation dropped from over 90,000 in 2007 to 47,890 in the second half of 2015.

In 2019, TI Media, successor to IPC, sold NME and Uncut to Singaporean company Bandlab Technologies.

The Ultimate Music GuideUncut often produces themed spin-off titles celebrating the career of one artist. This series is now known as The Ultimate Music Guide, but was initially known as Uncut Legends. The series started in 2003 with an inaugural issue devoted to Bob Dylan, edited by Nigel Williamson (though the majority of titles that followed were produced by magazine editor Chris Hunt),followed by magazines entirely devoted to Radiohead, Kurt Cobain, U2, Bruce Springsteen, Tom Waits and John Lennon (with the Lennon magazine being produced to commemorate the 25th anniversary of the death of the former Beatle).  

Since the series was rebranded as The Ultimate Music Guide, artists such as  Kraftwerk, Wilco, Creedence Clearwater Revival, The Fall and Talking Heads have been featured, with updated and expanded versions of earlier guides also released as Deluxe Editions (for example Lennon: 80th Birthday Edition or PJ Harvey's guide which came out again as a '30th Anniversary Edition' in June 2021).

In 2021, Uncut launched more spin-offs including The Complete Bob Dylan and The Beatles – Miscellany & Atlas, the latter being a publication typeset in the style of Schott's Miscellany.

The History of Rock

In 2015, The History of Rock (using a title previously used for an Orbis Publishing partwork) was launched as a spin-off from Uncut. The new magazine would cover the key events in rock history by year, starting in 1965 and continuing to the present day (though the series was never completed). The History of Rock reproduced contemporary articles that had originally appeared in the music publications of IPC Magazines, with articles from Melody Maker and the NME (used for the period 1965 to 1990) joined by articles from Vox and Uncut in later issues.

Ultimate Genre Guide
Another spin-off to Bandlab's Ultimate Music Guide is the Ultimate Genre Guide, which takes an in depth look at a particular music style. Magazines in this series include 2021's Ultimate Genre Guide to Shoegaze which features articles about The Jesus and Mary Chain, Lush and My Bloody Valentine, as well as issues devoted to Punk, Glam and Soul

Uncut Music Award
In 2008, Uncut launched its inaugural Uncut Music Award; this is described as "a quest to find the most inspiring and rewarding musical experience of the past year". A list of 25 nominees is selected by a panel of 10 judges, who are all musicians or music industry professionals, and they come together to decide a winner. Past winners have included Fleet Foxes (2008), Tinariwen (2009), Paul Weller (2010) and P.J. Harvey (2011).

Uncut DVD
In late 2005, editor Allan Jones and publishing director Andrew Sumner launched a spin-off of the main movies and music magazine, that focused its attention on DVD releases of classic movies. Billed as "the only great movie magazine", Uncut DVD was designed to compete with such established titles as Ultimate DVD, DVD Review and DVD Monthly. Despite strong reviews in the UK trade press, Uncut DVD'' folded after three quarterly issues.

Notes

1997 establishments in the United Kingdom
DVD magazines
Former Time Warner subsidiaries
Magazines established in 1997
Magazines published in London
Music magazines published in the United Kingdom
Monthly magazines published in the United Kingdom
Periodicals with audio content